Emmar Towers are  commercial towers, located in Amman, Jordan, between 5th and 6th circles.  The towers feature conference rooms and 78 offices. They are considered to be one of Amman's landmarks due to their unique architecture.

References

See also
 List of tallest buildings in Amman

Buildings and structures in Amman
Tourist attractions in Amman